Conus kirkandersi is a species of sea snail, a marine gastropod mollusk in the family Conidae, the cone snails, cone shells or cones.

These snails are predatory and venomous. They are capable of "stinging" humans.

Description
Original description: "Shell small for genus, thick, heavy, squat; spire low, almost flattened; shoulder rounded smooth, without coronations; body whorl sculptured with 12-15 large, raised spiral cords and numerous fine spiral threads, giving shell rough appearance; lip of adults thickened; shell color pure white with 2 broad bands, one above mid-body and one below mid-body; bands often break up into large brown blotches and flammules; anterior tip of shell brown; several rows of dark brown spots often superimposed upon brown bands; spire white with evenly-spaced, dark brown, crescent-shaped flammules; protoconch and early whorls yellow; interior of aperture white with 2 brown bands, corresponding to external color bands; periostracum thick, brown, tufted along shoulder; animal bright red."

The size of the shell varies between 14 mm and 26 mm.

Distribution
Locus typicus: "North end of Cozumel Island, Quintana Roo, Mexico."

This marine species of Cone snail occurs in the Caribbean Sea off Mexico.

References

 Tucker J.K. & Tenorio M.J. (2013) Illustrated catalog of the living cone shells. 517 pp. Wellington, Florida: MdM Publishing.
 Puillandre N., Duda T.F., Meyer C., Olivera B.M. & Bouchet P. (2015). One, four or 100 genera? A new classification of the cone snails. Journal of Molluscan Studies. 81: 1-23

External links
 To World Register of Marine Species
 Cone Shells - Knights of the Sea
 

kirkandersi
Gastropods described in 1987